Jarosław Boberek (born 14 June 1963) is a Polish actor. He is the most popular voice actor in Poland for dubbing Donald Duck as well as King Julien in the Madagascar movies.

Private life
He is married to Ilona Kucińska, They have two sons, named Franciszek and Jan. Jarosław Boberek has a third son, Mateusz, from a previous marriage.

Filmography
Actor
 2021:  Squared Love as director
 2017: The Chairman's Ear as Janek, chairman's cousin (ep. 7, 14, 42)
 2015: Na dobre i na złe as Bernard (ep. 598-599, 603)
 2014: Ojciec Mateusz as waiter Paweł (ep. 152)
 2011: Battle of Warsaw 1920 as uhlan Paproch
 2010-2012: Barwy szczęścia as Radosław Kolanko candidate for mayor, Marczak's opponent
 2008-2015 Ojciec Mateusz as barman Władysław Filipiak (ep. 9, 19, 63, 129, 138, 139, 175)
 2007-2008: Twarzą w twarz as Borzęcki, CBŚ officer
 2007: Halo Hans! as Agent Reinchard, double Adolf Hitler
 2006: Pod powierzchnią
 2005-2008: Pitbull as Robert „Robo” Zawadzki
 2004: Na dobre i na złe as homeless (ep. 203)
 2003: Łowcy skór as Zenek, worker of Kamińska's undertake
 2002: To tu, to tam as Kuba
 2002: Where Eskimos Live as truck driver
 2002: The Hexer as Yarpen Zigrin (ep. 4)
 2002-2003: Psie serce as voice of dog Mars
 2001: Pieniądze to nie wszystko as late farmer on blockade
 2001: The Hexer as Yarpen Zigrin
 2000-2001: Przeprowadzki as constable Pyć
 1999-2009: Rodzina zastępcza as friendly policeman
 1999: Ostatnia misja as Goebbels, man of Bruno
 1999: Córy szczęścia as policeman
 1999: 4 w 1 as Bolek
 1998-2003: Miodowe lata as dodger
 1997: Boża podszewka as bandit
 1997-1998: 13. posterunek as gay (ep. 16)
 1997: Bride of War as member of AK
 1997: Sława i chwała
 1997: Krok as commander
 1996: Wirus as policeman
 1996: The Secret of Sagal jako porter
 1996: Awantura o Basię as Józef, caretaker in Tańska's home
 1995: Pułkownik Kwiatkowski as Kapitan Bąkiewicz (captain Bąkiewicz) w voivodeship squad of UB
 1995: Ekstradycja
 1995: Cwał
 1995: Gracze as cab driver on Okęcie
 1995: Ekstradycja
 1995: Sukces... as worker of Morawski Electronics
 1994: Spółka rodzinna as member of renovation team
 1993: Czterdziestolatek. 20 lat później as boy on impotent Cricoland
 1993: Łowca. Ostatnie starcie as policeman
 1980-2000: Dom as cab driver carrying Szczepan

Dubbing in Polish
Movies

 2011; Hip-Hip and Hurra - Peacock, Hummingbird, Squirl, Bear Dad, Bear son, Ostrage, Crane;
 2011: Kung Fu Panda 2 – Monkey
 2011: Gnomeo i Julia – Benny
 2011: Gwiezdne wojny: część IV - Nowa nadzieja
 2011: Jeż Jerzy – Asystent
 2011: Rango – Rockeye
 2011: Sezon na misia 3 – Bodzio
 2010: Shrek ma wielkie oczy – scared man
 2010: Potwory kontra Obcy: Dynie-mutanty z kosmosu – Brakujące ogniwo (Missing link)
 2010: Kung Fu Panda: Sekrety Potężnej Piątki – Mistrz Małpa (Master Monkey)
 2010: Kung Fu Panda: Święta, święta i Po – Małpa (Monkey)
 2010: Madagwiazdka – Król Julian (King Julian)
 2010: Safari 3D – Chino
 2010: Karate Kid – Pan Han
 2010: Biała i Strzała podbijają kosmos – Lenek
 2010: Jak ukraść księżyc – Vector
 2010: Shrek 4
 2010: Toy Story 3
 2010: I'm in the Band - Burger Pitt
 2010: Disco robaczki – Gnojak
 2010: Nasza niania jest agentem – Bob
 2010: Jeż Jerzy – Assistant
 2009: Planeta 51 – Skiff
 2009: Księżniczka i żaba
 2009: Renifer Niko ratuje święta – Juliusz
 2009: Załoga G − Blaster
 2009: Potwory kontra Obcy − Brakujące Ogniwo (Missing Link)
 2009: Hotel dla psów − Carl
 2008: Pingwiny z Madagaskaru – Król Julian (King Julian)
 2008: Madagaskar 2 − Król Julian (King Julian)
 2008: Sezon na misia 2 − Boguś
 2008: Łowcy smoków − Gruby John
 2008: Wyprawa na Księżyc 3D − Poopchev
 2008: Garfield: Festyn humoru – Stanislavski
 2008: Speed Racer
 2008: Małpy w kosmosie − Morda
 2008: Kung Fu Panda − Małpa (Monkey)
 2008: Asterix na olimpiadzie
 2007: S.A.W. Szkolna Agencja Wywiadowcza – Lenny
 2007: Lucky Luke na Dzikim Zachodzie − Piotr
 2007: Pada Shrek –
 One of the mouses
 One of the pigs
 2007: Don Chichot
 2007: Alvin i wiewiórki
 2007: Tom i Jerry: Dziadek do orzechów
 2007: Film o pszczołach – Komar Mooseblood (Mooseblood Mosquito)
 2007: Rodzinka Robinsonów
 2007: Na fali – Jeżowiec
 2007: 7 krasnoludków: Las to za mało − historia jeszcze prawdziwsza – Kozak
 2006: Magiczna kostka – Tristan
 2006: iCarly – Angel (episode 34)
 2006: Kacper: Szkoła postrachu
 2006: Po rozum do mrówek
 2006: Tom i Jerry: Piraci i kudłaci
 2006: Stefan Malutki – Pryszcz
 2006: Artur i Minimki – Travel Agent
 2006: Pajęczyna Charlotty – Krowa Elwyn
 2006: Sposób na rekina − Bart
 2006: Happy Feet: Tupot małych stóp – Ramon
 2006: Dżungla
 2006: Brzydkie kaczątko i ja – William
 2006: Skok przez płot – Kot Tiger (Cat Tiger)
 2006: Sezon na misia – Boguś
 2006: Epoka lodowcowa 2: Odwilż
 2006: Wpuszczony w kanał − Rybka / Pomocnik Ala Ropucha z zatkanym nosem (Fish / Al Ropuch's assistant with plugged nose)
 2005: Madagaskar – Król Julian (King Julian)
 2005: Magiczna karuzela – Dylan
 2005: Tom i Jerry: Szybcy i kudłaci
 2005: Zebra z klasą – Kogut Mędrek (Cock Mędrek)
 2005: Szeregowiec Dolot – Heniek
 2005: Kurczak Mały
 2005: Charlie i fabryka czekolady – Store owner
 2005: Czerwony Kapturek – prawdziwa historia – Lumberjack Kirk
 2004: Rybki z ferajny – Lenny
 2004: Ruchomy zamek Hauru – Calcifer
 2004: Przygody lisa Urwisa – Brichemer
 2004: W 80 dni dookoła świata – Passepartout
 2004: Mickey: Bardziej bajkowe święta − Kaczor Donald (Donald Duck)
 2004: Baśniowy Świat 6 – Kaczor Donald (Donald Duck)
 2004: Baśniowy Świat 5 − Kaczor Donald
 2004: Legenda telewizji
 2004: Magiczny kamień – Galger
 2004: Lucky Luke (Les Daltons) – Joe Dalton
 2004: Gwiezdne jaja: Część I − Zemsta świrów –
 Jim, cleaner spy
 Winnetou
 2004: Shrek 2 – Reporter programu Knajci
 2004: Mickey, Donald, Goofy: Trzej muszkieterowie – Kaczor Donald (Donald Duck)
 2003: Sindbad: Legenda siedmiu mórz - Szczur (Rat)
 2003: Gdzie jest Nemo? – Jacques
 2003: Baśniowy Świat 3 – Kaczor Donald (Donald Duck)
 2003: Zapłata
 2003: Dobry piesek – Bob
 2003: Liga najgłupszych dżentelmenów
 2003: Old School: Niezaliczona
 2003: Opowieść o Zbawicielu – Święty Piotr (Saint Peter)
 2003: 101 dalmatyńczyków II: Londyńska przygoda
 2003: Piotruś Pan –
 Pirates
 Twardy Hrabia (Hard count)
 Chief
 Clerk
 2002: Dzika rodzinka − Nigel
 2002: Barbie jako Roszpunka –
 Otto
 Guard #1
 2002: Mali agenci 2: Wyspa marzeń
 2002: Królewska broda
 2002: Planeta skarbów
 2002: Tristan i Izolda – Baron Ganelon
 2002: Smocze wzgórze – Tristan
 2002: Epoka lodowcowa – Zeke
 2002: Pinokio – Kot (Cat)
 2002: Gwiezdne wojny: część II − Atak klonów –
 Watto
 Owen Lars
 Droid #1
 Ask Aak
 2001: Spirited Away: W krainie bogów
 2001: But Manitou jako Abahachi
 2001: Shrek –
 First blind mouse
 One of Lord Farquaad's knights
 2001: Atlantyda – Zaginiony ląd
 1999: SpongeBob Kanciastoporty- Krol Neptun (King Neptune), Skalmir Maminsyn (Squilliam Fancyson)
 1999: Kraina elfów
 1999: Król sokołów
 1999: Ed, Edd i Eddy - Ed
 1999: Mickey: Bajkowe święta – Kaczor Donald (Donald Duck)
 1998: Babe – świnka w mieście – Kiri
 1998: Rodzina Addamsów: Zjazd rodzinny
 1997: Herkules – Ból
 1997: Pożyczalscy
 1996: 101 dalmatyńczyków – Policeman
 1996: Miłość i wojna
 1995: Rob Roy − Cunningham
 1994: Scooby Doo i baśnie z tysiąca i jednej nocy – Bubu
 1994: Księżniczka łabędzi (TV version)
 1994: Skoś trawnik tato, a dostaniesz deser
 1993: Uwolnić orkę
 1992: Tom i Jerry: Wielka ucieczka – Tom
 1988: Yogi i inwazja kosmitów
 1988: Judy Jetson i rockersi
 1987: Kocia ferajna w Beverly Hills – Choo Choo
 1987: Jetsonowie spotykają Flintstonów
 1987: Miś Yogi i czarodziejski lot Świerkową Gęsią – Mirkin
 1987: Wielka ucieczka Misia Yogi – Poper
 1986: Amerykańska opowieść − he sang songs
 1982: Tajemnica IZBY
 1978: Władca Pierścieni – Gollum
 1964: Miś Yogi: Jak się macie - Misia znacie? – Szaber
 1961: 101 Dalmatyńczyków − Sierżant Czmych (Sergeant Tibbs) (1995 Version)

References

1963 births
Living people
People from Szczecinek
Polish male film actors
Polish male voice actors